The Gaelic Athletic Association/Gaelic Players Association Young Hurler of the Year (known for sponsorship reasons as the PwC GAA/GPA Young Hurler of the Year, or simply the Young Hurler of the Year) is an annual award given to the player aged 21 or under at the start of the season who is adjudged to have been the best during the All-Ireland Championship. The award has been presented since the 1996 All-Ireland Championship and the winner is chosen by a vote amongst the members of the players' trade union, the Gaelic Players Association (GPA). The first winner of the award was Limerick defender Mark Foley. The current holder is Adrian Mullen, who won the award for Kilkenny GAA in 2019. The only 2 players to ever win the award twice are Eoin Kelly, who won it in both 2001 and 2002 and Eoin Cody, 2020 and 2021.

A shortlist of nominees is published in September and the winner of the award, along with the winners of the GAA/GPA's other annual awards, is announced at a gala event in Dublin in November. The players themselves consider the award to be highly prestigious, because the winner is chosen by his peers.

Winners
The award has been presented on 24 occasions as of 2019, with 23 different winners. The table also indicates where the winning player also won one of the other major "hurler of the year" awards, namely the GAA/GPA Hurler of the Year award (HOTY).

Breakdown of winners

References

External links
 The official website of the Gaelic Players Association

1996 establishments in Ireland
Awards established in 1996
Young
Hurling awards